The 1979–80 Alpha Ethniki was the 44th season of the highest football league of Greece. From that season Alpha Ethniki became the professional league. The season began on 30 September 1979 and ended on 25 May 1980 with the play-off matches. Olympiacos won their 21st Greek title and their first one in five years.

The point system was: Win: 2 points - Draw: 1 point.

League table

Results

Play-offs

Championship play-off

Third-place play-off

Top scorers

References

External links
Official Greek FA Site
Greek SuperLeague official Site

Alpha Ethniki seasons
Greece
1979–80 in Greek football leagues